SAIS, SAIs or Sais may refer to:

SAIS 
 Paul H. Nitze School of Advanced International Studies, part of the Johns Hopkins University
 Sharjah American International School, in Sharjah, United Arab Emirates
 South African Institute of Stockbrokers
 Southern Association of Independent Schools, U.S.
 Stamford American International School, located in Singapore
 Strange Adventures in Infinite Space, a 2002 computer game

SAIs
 Supreme audit institutions

Sais 
 Sais (genus), a genus of butterflies in the family Nymphalidae
 Sais, Egypt, an ancient civilization on the River Nile
 Sais, the Welsh language word for an English person
 sais, misspelling of sai, a type of dagger-like weapon (sai in plural form is simply sai)